Myles or Miles Evans may refer to:

Myles Evans (American football)
Myles Evans (singer)
Miles Evans, musician who worked with Lew Soloff
Myles Evans (Actor)